Azabache (Spanish: "jet (lignite)") is the third studio album by Spanish singer Marta Sánchez. Was released in 1997. On this album more producers were involved (Andres Levin, Nile Rodgers, Camus Celli, Robyn Smith and Stephen Budd) along with longtime musical partner Christian De Walden and they created a rock oriented album, instead of the pop music Marta recorded for her first and second album. Critical reaction was mostly positive. The first single "Moja Mi Corazón", features guitar player Slash and was produced by Nile Rodgers. The album yielded five singles: "Negro Azabache", "Algo Tienes", "Ya Ves" and "Amor Perdido". While promoting this album, Marta recorded along with opera singer Andrea Bocelli the song "Vivo por Ella", which became a worldwide smash hit and was later included on the international pressings of "Azabache". The majority of the tracks were recorded in English (as usual for any Marta Sanchez album) and were released under the title One Step Closer.

Track listing

Spanish version: Azabache

English version: One Step Closer

Personnel
For the tracks "Moja Mi Corazón" and "Lampara Mágica"
 Producers: Andres Levin, Nile Rodgers and Camus Celli
 Acoustic guitar: Raúl Conte
 Lead guitar: Slash
 Guitars: Nile Rodgers
 Bass: Andy Hess
 Keyboards and percussions: C-n-A
 Recorded at Le Crib Svuga Svuga & Right Track Studios by Gary Tole
 Mixed at Right Track Studios by C-n-A and Nile Rodgers
 Photography: J.M. Ferratier
 Stylist: Beatriz Alvarez
 Design: Pedro Delgado

For the tracks "Negro Azabache" and "Ya Ves"
 Producers: Robyn Smith and Stephen Budd
 Keyboards programming: Robyn Smith
 Rap ("Ya Ves"): Sarjant D
 Sax: "Snake" Davis
 Guitar: Albert Rutland

For the rest of the tracks
 Producers: Christian De Walden and Max DiCarlo
 Co-Producer and engineer: Walter Clissen
 Recorder and mixer: Walter Clissen and Jeff Griffin
 Drums: John Robinson
 Bass: Bob Glaub
 Acoustic piano: Randy Waldman
 Guitars: John Hannah and Max DiCarlo
 Keyboards and synthesizers: Max DiCarlo
 Percussion: Efrain Toro
 Sax: Doug Norwine
 Background vocals: Thania Sanchez, Gisa Vatchy, Bambi Jones and Brandy Jones

Chart performance

1997 albums
Marta Sánchez albums
Mercury Records albums
Albums produced by Nile Rodgers